Driss is a given name. Notable people with the name include:

Driss Basri (1938–2007), Moroccan politician, Interior Minister 1979–1999
Driss Ben-Brahim, former partner and head of Goldman Sachs trading
Driss Ben Hamed Charhadi (born 1937), the pseudonym for Larbi Layachi, a Moroccan story-teller
Driss Benhima, chairman of the board and CEO of Royal Air Maroc, the national airline of Morocco
Driss Benzekri (activist) (1950–2007), Moroccan left-wing political and human rights activist
Driss Benzekri (footballer) (born 1970), retired Moroccan football goalkeeper
Driss Chraïbi, (1926–2007), Moroccan author
Driss Debbagh (died 1986), Moroccan ambassador to Italy (1959–1961)
Driss El Himer (born 1974), French long-distance runner
Driss El Khouri, Moroccan novelist
Driss Jettou (born 1945), the Prime Minister of Morocco 2002–2007
Driss Ksikes, Moroccan journalist
Driss Maazouzi (born 1969), French 1500 metres runner
Driss Moussaid (born 1988), boxer from Morocco
Driss Seghir, Moroccan short-story Writer
Driss Temsamani, Moroccan American published Author and a Community Organizer
Mohamed Driss, Tunisian writer, actor, and director of theatre

See also
Bordj Omar Driss, municipality in Illizi Province, Algeria
Ouled Driss District, district in Souk Ahras Province, Algeria

Moroccan masculine given names